Pologongka is a mountain peak located at  above sea level in the Indian territory of Ladakh, far west of the Transhimalaya.

Location 
The peak is located in the north of Spangnak Ri and its overlooking at Leh-Nyoma highway.

Climbing history 
In August 1997, Mike Ratty, Richard Law, Trevor Willis, and Narindar Chakula accomplished the first ascent of Pologongka.

References 

Six-thousanders of the Transhimalayas
Mountains of the Transhimalayas
Mountains of Ladakh